Gyachung Kang (Gyāchung Kāng) is a mountain in the Mahalangur Himal section of the Himalayas, and is the highest peak between Cho Oyu (8,201 m) and Mount Everest (8,848 m). It lies on the border between Nepal and China. As the fifteenth-highest peak in the world, it is also the highest peak that is not eight thousand metres tall; hence, it is far less well-known than the lowest of the eight-thousanders, which are only about  higher. The peak's lack of significant prominence (700 m) also contributes to its relative obscurity.

Climbing history 
The mountain was first climbed on April 10, 1964, by Y. Kato, K. Sakaizawa and Pasang Phutar, and on the next day by K. Machida and K. Yasuhisa.

The north face was first climbed in 1999 by a Slovene expedition and was repeated by Yasushi Yamanoi in 2002.

View

References

Further reading

 Dahlman, Chris (2021). This Is Gyachung: The Story of Seiko's First Professional Mountaineer's Watch.

External links
Slovene Gyachung Kang '99 Expedition at MountainZone.com
 Costly success on Gyachung Kang
 Report on the first ascent 1964 by Yukihiko Kato 
 Gyachung Kang Virtual Aerial Video
New research in This Is Gyachung proves that Seiko's first professional watch came earlier than we had previously thought. (hodinkee.com)

Mountains of Tibet
China–Nepal border
International mountains of Asia
Seven-thousanders of the Himalayas
Mountains of Koshi Province